Alice is a 2009 short story collection by the German writer Judith Hermann. It was shortlisted for the Independent Foreign Fiction Prize.

See also
 2009 in literature
 German literature

References

2009 short story collections
German short story collections
S. Fischer Verlag books